Mostafa Mahdavikia (born 16 September 1984 in Tehran, Iran) is an Iranian football player and nephew  of Mehdi Mahdavikia. He currently plays for Alvand Hamedan. He usually plays the attacking midfielder/striker position.

Club career 
Mostafa started his career at Bank Melli FC just like other members of the Mahdavikia family such as Mehdi Mahdavikia and Hadi Mahdavikia. Mostafa was then transferred to Iranian powerhouses Persepolis FC just like his Uncle Mehdi.

When Mehdi Mahdavikia was asked about Mostafa Mahdavikia he said:

He signed for Fajr Sepasi on January 24, 2007.

External links
Persian League Profile

Living people
Iranian footballers
Fajr Sepasi players
Sanati Kaveh players
Persepolis F.C. players
Foolad Yazd players
1984 births
People from Tehran
Association football forwards
Association football midfielders